Mickey Mouse Mixed-Up Adventures is an American computer-animated preschool television series that was broadcast on Disney Junior. Produced by Disney Television Animation, the series is the successor to Mickey Mouse Clubhouse. Originally airing as Mickey and the Roadster Racers for its first two seasons, it debuted in the United States on January 15, 2017.

The series was renewed for a second season on March 15, 2017. The second season premiered on April 13, 2018. The show’s third season was renewed one year later, which led to the series being renamed as Mickey Mouse Mixed-Up Adventures; the first episode under the new title was originally broadcast on October 14, 2019.

This was Russi Taylor's final television series role before she died on July 26, 2019; it was also the first series not to feature Donald's regular voice actor Tony Anselmo due to him being busy providing the voice for the character in other Disney projects.

The show was followed by a new series, Mickey Mouse Funhouse, which debuted on August 20, 2021; in 2021, two spin-off holiday specials were released: a Halloween special, Mickey's Tale of Two Witches, on October 7, 2021, in addition to a Christmas special, Mickey and Minnie Wish Upon a Christmas, on December 2, 2021.

Plot
Mickey Mouse Mixed-Up Adventures is about the Sensational Six (Mickey, Minnie, Goofy, Donald, Daisy and Pluto) as they race around their town of Hot Dog Hills, and around the world (Pluto doesn't race in any way). Unlike the previous series, this show contains two 11-minute stories as opposed to Clubhouses full-length 22-minute stories. In the first half, Billy Beagle commentates on Mickey and his friends' races whether the race is in Hot Dog Hills or somewhere else around the world.

In the second half, Minnie and Daisy work as the Happy Helpers alongside Cuckoo Loca (from Minnie's Bow-Toons) where they help out different residents of Hot Dog Hills. Minnie and Daisy use the Turnstyler located in the office and the Happy Helper Van to assume the clothes associated with their jobs that they are hired to help out on.

In Season 2, the Roadster Racers get their roadsters modified by Ludwig Von Drake so that they can perform Supercharged moves. In Season 2, the theme song (and a segment of the introduction) is also slightly altered near the end for the Supercharged part.

In Season 3, Mickey builds a mixed-up motor lab that mixes up and transforms cars. It starts to use the classic "Hot Dog" song originally written and performed by They Might Be Giants for Mickey Mouse Clubhouse. This new version of the song is placed between the two segments of each episode and at the end of the final segment.

Episodes

Characters

Main
 Mickey Mouse (voiced by Bret Iwan) is the leader of the Roadster Racers and owner of Mickey's garage. Mickey drives the Hot Doggin' Hot Rod which turns into Mickey's car.
 Minnie Mouse (voiced by Russi Taylor from 2017 to 2019, Kaitlyn Robrock from 2020 to 2021) is Mickey's sweetheart and one of the Happy Helpers. Minnie drives Pink Thunder which turns into the Happy Helpers' van.
 Donald Duck (voiced by Daniel Ross) is the co-leader and co-owner of Mickey's garage and Mickey's partner. Donald drives the Cabin Cruiser which turns into Donald's car. Donald is the most determined racer and attempts to win.
 Daisy Duck (voiced by Tress MacNeille) is Donald's sweetheart and one of the Happy Helpers. Daisy drives Snapdragon which turns into the car made by herself.
 Goofy (voiced by Bill Farmer) is the owner of the Hot Diggity hot dog trailer frequented by Pete. Goofy drives the Turbo Tubster which turns into the car made by himself.
 Pluto (vocal effects provided by Bill Farmer) is Mickey's pet dog.
 Cuckoo Loca (voiced by Nika Futterman) is a female wind-up cuckoo who lives in Minnie and Daisy's cuckoo clock and tags along with the Happy Helpers. A running gag is that Cuckoo Loca tends to make sarcastic remarks towards the Happy Helpers jingle.

Recurring
 Chip and Dale (voiced by Tress MacNeille and Corey Burton respectively) are two chipmunks who are mechanics for the racers. 
 Pete (voiced by Jim Cummings) is the Hot Dog Hills' resident tow truck driver and owner of Pete's Junkyard. Pete drives the Super Crusher when Pete gets involved in races. In addition to having some relatives that get involved, Pete appears in various alter egos throughout the series.
 Clarabelle Cow (voiced by April Winchell) is a cow and the owner of a baking business in Hot Dog Hills. She is often seen operating the racing flags. Clarabelle has also been seen hosting several international events on the show. She works as Goofy's girlfriend.
 Clara Cluck (vocal effects provided by Russi Taylor from 2017 to 2020, Kaitlyn Robrock in 2020) is a female farmer and resident of Hot Dog Hills who mostly speaks chicken language.
 Horace Horsecollar (voiced by Bill Farmer) who, in addition to being a resident of Hot Dog Hills, appears in various alter egos throughout the series.
 Ludwig Von Drake (voiced by Corey Burton) is Donald's uncle and the Hot Dog Hills' residential inventor who has a laboratory beneath Mickey's garage. In "Grandpa Beagle's Day Out", it is revealed that Ludwig Von Drake also operates as a bicycle mechanic shop under the alias of Doc Sprockets.
 Hilda (voiced by April Winchell) is a female hippopotamus who engages in any sport.
 Figaro (vocal effects provided by Frank Welker) is Minnie's pet tuxedo cat.
 Butch (vocal effects provided by Frank Welker) is Pete's pet bulldog and Pluto's rival.
 Millie and Melody Mouse (voiced by Avalon Robbins and Grace Kaufman in Season 1-2 and Vivian Vencer and Stella Edwards in Season 3 respectively) are Minnie's nieces.
 Billy Beagle (voiced by Jay Leno) is the announcer and sports commentator of the races and other events. Billy is also shown to have a collection of roadsters and also works as the host of "Billy Beagle's Tip Top Garage".
 Commander Heist (voiced by Steve Valentine) is an infamous male British international master criminal who is the main antagonist of the series.
 Lazlo (vocal effects provided by Dee Bradley Baker) is Commander Heist's pet cat.
 Robbie Roberts (voiced by Tim Gunn) is a critic and fashion male designer who appears to be a judge and receives very harsh reviews from the crowd.

Hot Dog Hills residents
 Mayor McBeagle (voiced by Bill Farmer) is the male mayor of Hot Dog Hills.
 Mr. Bigby (voiced by Bill Farmer) is a rich male pig who is the owner of the Bigby Bank & Trust and whose name is Bertram.
 Mrs. Bigby (voiced by Andrea Martin) is a female poodle who is Mr. Bigby's wife and whose name is Pinky.
 Susie Beagleman (voiced by Natalie Coughlin) is a little female beagle girl that the Happy Helpers tend to help out on occasion.
 Mrs. Beagleman (voiced by Tress MacNeille) is Susie's mother.
 Clifford and Cleo Cluck (vocal effects provided by Dee Bradley Baker) are Clara Cluck's chicks who mostly speak chicken language.
 Elray Thunderboom (voiced by Evan Kishiyama) is a male elephant.
 Mr. Thunderboom (voiced by Jim Cummings) is Elray's father.
 Mrs. Thunderboom (voiced by Nika Futterman) is Elray's mother.
 Bitsy Beagleberg (voiced by Mckenna Grace) is a young female beagle girl.
 Maynard McSnorter (voiced by Patton Oswalt) is a male pig who is the head of Hot Dog Hills' condiment factory.
 Mrs. McSnorter (voiced by Russi Taylor) is a female pig who is married to Maynard McSnorter.
 Pearl McSnorter (voiced by Stella Edwards) is a female pig who is the sister of Puck McSnorter.
 Puck McSnorter (voiced by August Maturo) is a male pig who is the brother of Pearl McSnorter.
 Buddy McBilly (voiced by Cooper Stutler) is a young male goat who was shy at first. Starting with season 3, Buddy is considered a fan of Mickey.
 Mr. McBilly (voiced by Bill Farmer) is Buddy's father.
 Mrs. McBilly (voiced by Leigh-Allyn Baker) is Buddy's mother.
 Jinx (vocal effects provided by Dee Bradley Baker) is a white female kitten that wears a bow and causes trouble wherever Jinx goes and always has a red bouncy ball, hence her name. Jinx later gets adopted by Emmy Lou.
 Babette Beagle (voiced by Jane Leeves) is the curator of the Hot Dog Hills Art Museum.
 Mr. Doozy (voiced by Fred Willard) is the manager of the Snoozy Doozy Bed and Breakfast who also works as its bellhop, cook and repairman.
 Nina Doozy (voiced by Leigh-Allyn Baker) is a relative of Mr. Doozy.
 Dandelion Doozy (voiced by Leigh-Allyn Baker) is Nina Doozy's niece.
 Grandpa Beagle (voiced by Héctor Elizondo) is the grandfather of Billy Beagle who is into extreme sports much to Billy's dismay.
 Emmy Lou (voiced by Kate Micucci) is a female beagle who first appeared working as the first mate of Captain Peterson. In "Hi Jinx", Emmy Lou moves into the apartment across from the Happy Helpers' office and gets Jinx as a pet.
 Mrs. Sweetums (voiced by Hoda Kotb in "Super Sweet Helpers", Tress MacNeille in "Cuckoo in Hot Dog Hills!") is the proprietor of the candy store Sweetums' Sweets.
 Ivy Beaglesnoot (voice by Nika Futterman) is the proprietor of the Hot Dog Hills Wild Animal Safari Park.
 Uncle Goof (voiced by Bill Farmer) is an explorer who is Goofy's uncle.
 Jimbo (voiced by Fred Stoller) is Pete's nephew.
 Mama Pete (voiced by Elayne Boosler) is the mother of Pete and the aunt of Jimbo.
 GramQuacker Lily (voiced by Tress MacNeille) is Daisy's grandmother.
 Uncle Manny (voiced by Richard Kind) is Donald's uncle.
 Lisa Longtree (voiced by Leigh-Allyn Baker)
 Coach Hannah (voiced by Leigh-Allyn Baker) is Hilda's ice-skating coach.
 Fiona Featherstone (voiced by Leigh-Allyn Baker)
 Portia DeHound (voiced by Leigh-Allyn Baker) is an actress.
 Jasper (voiced by Maulik Pancholy) is the Pet Store owner.

Characters in international locations 
The following characters reside in international locations that Team Mickey visits for their events:

 José Carioca and Panchito Pistoles (voiced by Rob Paulsen and Carlos Alazraqui) are Donald's friends and members the band the Three Cabarallos.
 Queen Elizabeth II (voiced by Jane Leeves) is depicted as a female mouse in this show.
 Auntie Olina (voiced by Tia Carrere) is a female friend of Team Mickey who resides in Hawaii.
 Leilani (voiced by Megan Richie) is the daughter of Olina.
 Grandpa Kai (voiced by Jim Cummings) is the father of Olina and grandfather of Leilani. In "Grandpa vs. Grandpa", it is revealed that Kai had a rivalry with Grandpa Beagle.
 William "Willie" Bartholomew Beagle (voiced by Steve Valentine) is a male British announcer for British events that Mickey and his friends take part in.
 Dr. Waddleton Crutchley (voiced by Peter Serafinowicz in "Tea Time Trouble!", Stephen Fry in "Shenannygans!") is male resident of London who teaches people how to act like gentlemen.
 Chef Pierre la Pierre (voiced by Jon Curry) is a male chef in Paris, France who is good friends with Mickey.
 Chef Celeste (voiced by Marieve Herington) is a chef and the star pupil of a culinary academy who originally operated as the Phantom Chef.
 Patrice (vocal effects provided by Dee Bradley Baker) is Chef Celeste's pet poodle.
 Cuckoo La-La (voiced by Nika Futterman) is a female fashion designer in Paris, France who is Cuckoo-Loca's cousin.
 Almanda de Quack (voiced by Camilla Belle) is Daisy's cousin from Brazil.
 Heidi (voiced by Leigh-Allyn Baker) is an activities director in Switzerland.
 Raj (voiced by Ariyah Kssam) is a friend of Mickey's group who lives in India.
 Savi (voiced by Richa Shulka) is a friend of Mickey's group and Raj's wife who lives in India.
 Princess Olivia (voiced by Madison Pettis) is the Princess of Royalandia.

Release

Broadcast
The first season of Mickey and the Roadster Racers debuted on Disney Junior in the United States on January 15, 2017. The series also aired on Disney Junior in Canada on January 24, Disney Junior in Australia on March 17, Disney Junior in Asia on March 24, Disney Junior in the UK and Ireland on April 19, Disney Junior in South Africa on April 22 and Disney Channel in India on May 15.

Home media
The first release, entitled "Mickey and the Roadster Racers" was released on DVD on March 7, 2017. "Minnie's Happy Helpers" was released on July 25, 2017, with the release themed around the Minnie and Daisy subplots. "Disney Junior Holiday" was released on October 23, 2018. "Minnie Bow Be Mine" was released on February 5, 2019. The show was re-released on Disney's streaming service, Disney+ and in select countries under Disney+ Hotstar.

Note: In the Disney+ reprint, in the Season 1 episode, Ye Olde Royal Heist, the scene where Lord Pete bumps Donald's Roadster into the River Thames was cut for unknown reasons.

Reception

Critical reception 
Charles Curtis of USA Today ranked the television series 9th in their "20 best shows for kids right now" list, asserting, "Whether it's Mickey Mouse Clubhouse, Mickey and the Roadster Racers or Mickey Mouse Mixed-Up Adventures, they're all good." Emily Ashby of Common Sense Media rated the series a 3 out of 5 stars, and complimented the presence of positive messages and role models, citing sustaining friendships and forgiveness, while saying the series manages to be entertaining.

Accolades

Spin-offs

Chip 'n Dale's Nutty Tales 
Chip 'n Dale's Nutty Tales is a spin-off series which premiered on November 13, 2017. It aired in the daytime Disney Junior programming block for younger audiences. The plot revolves around Chip and Dale venturing and helping their friends in Hot Dog Hills. They interact with various characters from Mickey Mouse Mixed-Up Adventures.

Holiday Specials 
There were two spinoff holiday specials released in 2021: Mickey's Tale of Two Witches and Mickey and Minnie Wish Upon a Christmas. These two were produced by the same crew as Mickey Mouse Mixed-Up Adventures, and take place in Hot Dog Hills. In 2022, a stop motion holiday special, Mickey Saves Christmas was released. It takes place in Hot Dog Hills, and some of the recurring characters of Mickey Mouse Mixed-Up Adventures appear, thus making it a spin off of the series. None of these specials are officially part of the series, but they are spinoffs.

Mickey's Tale of Two Witches 
Mickey's Tale of Two Witches is a spinoff Halloween special that aired on October 7, 2021. It is the first spinoff holiday special. Mickey tells Pluto a story about two witches-in-training, Minnie the Wonderful and Daisy Doozy who work together to defeat a ghost and save Happy Haunt Hills.

Mickey and Minnie Wish Upon a Christmas 
Mickey and Minnie Wish Upon a Christmas is a spinoff Christmas special that aired on December 2, 2021. It is the second spinoff holiday special. Mickey and friends get separated after shopping for gifts, and have to get back to Hot Dog Hills to celebrate Christmas together.

Mickey Saves Christmas 
Mickey Saves Christmas is a spinoff Christmas special that aired on November 27, 2022. Unlike the previous holiday specials, this one is in stop motion. Mickey and friends travel from Hot Dog Hills to the North Pole to save Christmas and learn the true meaning of celebrating the holiday.

Notes

References

External links
 
  on DisneyNOW

2010s American animated television series
2020s American animated television series
2017 animated television series debuts
2017 American television series debuts
2021 American television series endings
American children's animated action television series
American children's animated adventure television series
American children's animated comedy television series
American children's animated fantasy television series
American children's animated sports television series
American preschool education television series
Animated preschool education television series
2010s preschool education television series
2020s preschool education television series
Animated television series about auto racing
American computer-animated television series
Disney Junior original programming
Donald Duck television series
English-language television shows
Mickey Mouse television series
Television series by Disney Television Animation
American animated television spin-offs